Thorophos is a genus of marine hatchetfishes native to the western Central Pacific Ocean.

Species
There are currently two recognized species in this genus:
 Thorophos euryops Bruun, 1931
 Thorophos nexilis (G. S. Myers, 1932)

References

Sternoptychidae
Taxa named by Anton Frederik Bruun
Marine fish genera
Ray-finned fish genera